Surrey-Panorama is a provincial electoral district in British Columbia, Canada, established by the Electoral Districts Act, 2008. It came into existence following the dissolution of the BC Legislature in April 2009 and was contested for the first time in the 2009 provincial election. The 2008 re-distribution created this riding out of mainly Surrey-Panorama Ridge, with portions of Surrey-Cloverdale and Surrey-White Rock.

Demographics

MLAs
This riding has elected the following Members of Legislative Assembly:

Electoral history 

|-

 
|New Democratic
|Debbie Lawrance
|align="right"|8,675
|align="right"|39.82%
|align="right"|n/a

|- bgcolor="white"
!align="left" colspan=3|Total
!align="right"|21,785
!align="right"|100.00%
!align="right"|
|}

References

British Columbia provincial electoral districts
Politics of Surrey, British Columbia
Provincial electoral districts in Greater Vancouver and the Fraser Valley